Vitthal Sundar Parshurami (also Vithal Sundar) (died 10 August 1763), was a diplomat and the Prime Minister of Hyderabad (or Diwan) during the reign of Nizam Ali Khan (Asaf Jah II).  When Khan was appointed Subedar of the Deccan on 8 July 1762 he immediately appointed Sunder his Diwan and conferred upon him the title Raja Pratapwant.  Sunder belonged to the Deshastha Brahmin community of Maharashtra.  Sundar was Nizam's commander-in-chief during the Battle of Rakshasbhuvan on 10 August 1763, and was killed in the battle.

References

Marathi people
People from Maharashtra
1763 deaths
Year of birth unknown

People from Hyderabad State